David Wilson Jolly (born October 31, 1972) is an American attorney, former lobbyist and politician who served as the U.S. representative for Florida's 13th congressional district, based in Pinellas County, from 2014 to 2017. A former Republican, he previously served as general counsel to his predecessor, Bill Young. He won the race for Young's seat in a special election against Democrat Alex Sink. He was subsequently reelected in November 2014, winning 75 percent of the vote, but was unseated in 2016 by former Governor Charlie Crist after court-ordered redistricting made his district more Democratic. Since leaving office, Jolly has become a prominent Republican critic of U.S. president Donald Trump. In September 2018, Jolly announced he had left the Republican Party.

Early life
Jolly was born in Dunedin, Florida, the son of Judith and Lawson Jolly, a Baptist pastor. He received his B.A. degree from Emory University in 1994 and his J.D. degree from the George Mason University School of Law in 2001.

Early career
He worked for Republican U.S. Representative Bill Young full time from 1995 to 2006 in various positions, with a brief break for six months in 2001 when he worked at a Washington securities firm. In 2002, Jolly became Young's general counsel and held that position until he left in 2006. He served as the personal attorney for Young's family as well.

In 2007, Jolly joined Washington, D.C. firm Van Scoyoc Associates as a lobbyist and in 2011, he left Van Scoyoc to open his own firm, Three Bridges Advisors. He made political donations to both Republicans (about $36,000) and Democrats (about $30,000) during his time as a lobbyist. Jolly had his name removed from the Lobby Registry to run for the vacant House seat. At the time, Jolly was working as vice president of the Clearwater-based investment company Boston Finance Group.

Jolly and his first wife bought a condo in Indian Shores, Florida, in 2005 and a house in Washington, D.C., in 2007. His divorce from his wife Carrie was finalized on January 16, 2014, and Jolly married Laura Donahoe on July 3, 2015.

In July 2018, Jolly became executive vice president and principal of Shumaker Advisors Florida, LLC, a wholly owned subsidiary of the Shumaker, Loop, and Kendrick law firm, at their Tampa office. In making the announcement, the firm said he would be involved with various community issues, including the effort to build a new stadium for the Tampa Bay Rays major league baseball team.

Political career
Jolly formerly opposed the Patient Protection and Affordable Care Act but stated on an interview with MSNBC that during unemployment he had a new appreciation for its use as a "safety net". He is pro-life. Speaking about firearms policy, Jolly said: "I do believe the Second Amendment is a fundamental right, but I don't believe it's beyond the reach of regulation, and I believe it's appropriate to look at regulations that ultimately keep the guns out of the hands of criminals." He supports the Balanced Budget Amendment and says he would have voted to raise the debt limit in early 2014.

Jolly supports sending special operations forces overseas, securing the border, increasing the vetting process for legal immigrants, and increasing surveillance of suspected domestic terrorists. In February 2014, Jolly introduced the Naval Station Guantanamo Bay Protection Act.

Jolly pushed to extend the ban on oil drilling in the Gulf of Mexico. In January 2015, Jolly announced plans to introduce a bill that would extend the reforms of the federal flood insurance program. In July 2015, Jolly introduced the Veterans Health Care Freedom Act. Jolly encouraged the U.S. House to extend the Treasure Island beach renourishment project.

On July 21, 2014, Jolly announced his support for the legality of same-sex marriage, stating: "I believe in a form of limited government that protects personal liberty. To me, that means that the sanctity of one’s marriage should be defined by their faith and by their church, not by their state." He said "As a matter of my Christian faith, I believe in traditional marriage."

In April 2016, Jolly's United States Senate campaign spokesperson Sarah Bascom confirmed that the campaign had made edits to his Wikipedia page to remove information about Jolly, including references to the Church of Scientology and his lobbying activities, alleging that it presented a "public negative narrative" against him, and accused an unnamed rival campaign of adding "propaganda" to the article. Jolly called it "a careless staff mistake" and said that he stands by his record and wants the public to be fully informed.

Jolly was ranked as the 48th most bipartisan member of the U.S. House of Representatives during the 114th United States Congress (and the fourth most bipartisan member of the U.S. House of Representatives from Florida) in the Bipartisan Index created by The Lugar Center and the McCourt School of Public Policy that ranks members of the United States Congress by their degree of bipartisanship (by measuring the frequency each member's bills attract co-sponsors from the opposite party and each member's co-sponsorship of bills by members of the opposite party).

Since leaving office, Jolly has participated regularly as a political commentator on cable news sources such as CNN and MSNBC; in this capacity he has been critical of President Donald Trump and has fueled speculation that he would run for public office again. He considered running for lieutenant governor of Florida in 2018 on a bipartisan ticket, with former Democratic congressman Patrick Murphy as the candidate for governor. Jolly ultimately decided not to run for any public office in 2018.

Tenure

Committee assignments
 Committee on Appropriations
 Subcommittee on Commerce, Justice, Science, and Related Agencies
 Subcommittee on Military Construction, Veterans Affairs, and Related Agencies
 Subcommittee on Transportation, Housing and Urban Development, and Related Agencies

Caucus memberships
 Congressional Constitution Caucus

Elections

2014 special election

On January 14, 2014, Jolly won the Republican nomination over Mark Bircher and Kathleen Peters, winning a plurality of 45% of the vote. Jolly faced Democratic nominee Alex Sink  and a libertarian candidate, Lucas Overby, in the special election.  The race received national attention as possibly forecasting the mid-term elections that were coming in November of that year and became the most expensive Congressional race in history, with around $11M spent, $9M of it by outside groups. During the campaign there was friction between the National Republican Congressional Committee and Jolly; the RNC thought Jolly's campaign was inept, and Jolly criticized the negative ads run by the RNC. and voters were generally unhappy with the overwhelming number of attack ads on both sides.

Jolly won the election on March 11, 2014, with 48.4% of the vote after being behind in the early tallies; he was sworn into office on March 13.

2014 general election

Jolly ran for reelection to a full term in November 2014. He was unopposed in the Republican primary, and no Democrat ran against him in the general election; his only challenger was Lucas Overby, the Libertarian nominee who came in third in the special election one year prior. Jolly defeated Overby with 75% of the vote.

2016 U.S. Senate election

On July 20, 2015, Jolly announced that he was giving up his seat to run for the United States Senate seat being vacated by Marco Rubio, who was not running for reelection due to his bid for the U.S. presidency.  As of August 2015, it appeared that Jolly would face several opponents in the August 30, 2016 Republican primary election, including U.S. Representative Ron DeSantis and Lieutenant Governor of Florida Carlos López-Cantera. However, on June 17, 2016, after Rubio reversed his decision, Jolly withdrew from the Senate race to run for re-election to the House, citing "unfinished business."

2016 general election

In his bid for a second full term, Jolly faced former Florida Governor and St. Petersburg resident Charlie Crist, a former Republican who had turned Democratic after a brief stint as an independent. He found himself in a district that had been made significantly more Democratic after a court threw out Florida's original congressional map. Notably, it absorbed a heavily Democratic portion of southern Pinellas County, including almost all of St. Petersburg. Previously, some of the more Democratic portions of St. Petersburg had been in the Tampa-based 14th District.

Ultimately, Jolly lost to Crist by 51.9% to 48.1%. Jolly's defeat ended a 62-year hold on this St. Petersburg-based district by the GOP. William Cramer won the seat for the Republicans in 1954, handing it to Young in 1970. The district had changed numbers seven times during this period, from the 1st (1955-1963) to the 12th (1963-1967) to the 8th (1967-1973, 1983–1993) to the 6th (1973-1983) to the 10th (1993-2013) to the 13th (2013-present).

Electoral history

References

External links
 
 

|-

1972 births
21st-century American politicians
American lobbyists
Antonin Scalia Law School alumni
Emory University alumni
Florida Independents
George Mason University alumni
Living people
MSNBC people
People from Dunedin, Florida
Members of Forward (United States)
Republican Party members of the United States House of Representatives from Florida